Hittin' the Trail for Hallelujah Land is a 1931 Warner Bros. Merrie Melodies animated cartoon directed by Rudolf Ising. The short was released on November 28, 1931, and stars Piggy.

The minimal storyline centers on the plucky Piggy's efforts to rescue his girlfriend and a doglike Uncle Tom from perilous predicaments and villains. The short's use of the racial epithet "Uncle Tom" prompted United Artists to withhold it from syndication in 1968, making it one of the Censored Eleven.

Summary

Hittin' the Trail for Hallelujah Land has a rudimentary plot, unlike most of the Merrie Melodies of the time, which barely have any plot at all. The cartoon stars the Mickey Mouse-esque Piggy, his girlfriend Fluffy, and a canine Uncle Tom. The film opens with a singing steamboat dancing down a river. On the deck, three blackface caricatures play the song for which the short is named on the harmonica, banjo, and bones. Meanwhile, Uncle Tom drives Fluffy toward the boat by donkey cart. The scene shifts to Piggy the riverboat captain in a sequence reminiscent of Disney's 1928 film Steamboat Willie.

Fluffy joins the frolicking steamboat passengers and reunites with her boyfriend, but during the revelry, Piggy falls overboard. The pig has a run in with an alligator, but he makes it back to the boat. Meanwhile, Uncle Tom's donkey bucks him into a cemetery. There, in a variation on a stock gag featuring a superstitious black man, he is scared by three dancing skeletons reminiscent of those in Disney's 1929 short The Skeleton Dance. Tom escapes to the middle of the river, but a shoddy boat leaves him stranded and drowning. Piggy saves the day but not before a vaudevillian villain kidnaps Fluffy. Piggy captures the villain on a passing mail hook, leaving the villain tortured over a buzz saw. This short marks the second and last appearance of the characters Piggy and Fluffy.

Distribution
Hittin' the Trail for Hallelujah Land was released in theaters on November 28, 1931, by Warner Bros. The cartoon has been in the public domain since 1959 after its copyright expired and was not renewed. However, the cartoon has been withheld from distribution since 1968. At that time, United Artists owned the rights to some Looney Tunes and Merrie Melodies cartoons. Hittin' the Trail for Hallelujah Land and ten other cartoons were deemed to feature racist depictions of African Americans that were too integral to the films for simple cuts to make them palatable for modern audiences. The cartoon has never been released on laserdisc, home video, or DVD, not counting public domain home releases. These eleven cartoons make up the so-called Censored Eleven.

Reception
On December 19, 1931, Motion Picture Herald said, "A New York Strand audience seemed to enjoy this number of the Merrie Melodies series in which popular song numbers accompany the animated cartoon figures."

Credits
Produced by Hugh Harman, Rudolf Ising and Leon Schlesinger
Directed by Rudolf Ising (uncredited)
Drawn by Isadore Freleng and Paul Smith
Musical score by Frank Marsales

See also
 List of animated films in the public domain in the United States

References

External links
 
Hittin' the Trail for Hallelujah Land at the Big Cartoon Database
 
 

1931 films
1931 animated films
1931 short films
Merrie Melodies short films
Warner Bros. Cartoons animated short films
American black-and-white films
Films set in cemeteries
Censored Eleven
Films scored by Frank Marsales
Films based on works by Harriet Beecher Stowe
Films directed by Rudolf Ising
Piggy (Merrie Melodies) films
Films set on ships
Articles containing video clips
Vitaphone short films
Films about pigs
Animated films about dogs
1930s Warner Bros. animated short films
1930s English-language films